The FutureSex/LoveShow was the third concert tour by American singer-songwriter Justin Timberlake. It showcased his second studio album, FutureSex/LoveSounds (2006). The tour grossed $127.8 million. It was the third highest-grossing concert tour of 2007.

SexyBack Dance Club
A limited number of tickets were released which gave fans access to a bar/club area around the stage known as the SexyBack Dance Club. There were two types of these tickets available; Seating and Standing. The seating tickets gave fans access to this area as well as a seat integrated into the stage itself. The standing tickets gave access to the same area without a seat.

Critical reception
Rolling Stone editor Laura Checkoway, who attended the tour at the Madison Square Garden in April 2007, called the show "strictly grown and sexy" in her review. After attending the second Madison Square Garden date in August, Sia Michel from The New York Times thought "since his last tour, for 2002's multiplatinum Justified, he has learned how to project sex-symbol edge. During an ambitious, well-oiled spectacle of nearly three hours, this New Justin cursed, gyrated and mimicked bedroom acts with his lingerie-clad dancers." After attending The O2, London date, musicOMH's Jonny Carey wrote, "Tonight proved that as well as being responsible for some of this decade's best pop moments, Justin Timberlake is among the best performers and will be continuing to headline venues of this stature for years to come."

Opening acts
Pink (North America) (select dates)
Fergie (North America & Europe) (select dates)
Unklejam (Europe) (select dates)
Kenna (Europe) (select dates)
Natasha Bedingfield (Europe) (select dates)
Esmée Denters (Europe) (select dates)
Paris Wells (Australia) (selected dates)

Set list
"FutureSex/LoveSound"
"Like I Love You"
"My Love"  (contains excerpts from "Let Me Talk to You (Prelude)")
"Señorita"
"Sexy Ladies"
"Until the End of Time"
"What Goes Around... Comes Around"
"Chop Me Up"
"Rock Your Body"
Medley: "Gone" / "Take It from Here" / "Last Night"
"Damn Girl"
"Summer Love"
"Losing My Way"
"Cry Me a River"
"LoveStoned/I Think She Knows (Interlude)"
"SexyBack"
Encore
"(Another Song) All Over Again"

Shows

See also 
 List of highest-grossing concert tours

Notes

Broadcast and recordings
It was announced in May, 2007 that Timberlake signed a deal with the HBO network to broadcast the concert and then release it on DVD. The Madison Square Garden date for the second North American leg of the tour was added for this reason by HBO. The concert was filmed on the night of the show, August 16, and aired September 3, 2007. It also marked the first time that Timberlake would host a concert at Madison Square Garden where his boy band NSYNC also had their concert there back in 2000, which was also an HBO special.

The 2 disc edition of the FutureSex/LoveShow: Live from Madison Square Garden was released on DVD and Blu-ray exclusively in Best Buy on November 20, 2007 (although the Special Features disc in the Blu-ray package is a standard DVD). In Austria, the DVD was released on November 16, 2007.

References

Justin Timberlake concert tours
2007 concert tours